The Social Alliance was an electoral coalition created for the 1998 Polish local elections. Formed on 27 June 1998, the Social Alliance included the Polish People's Party along with its smaller left-oriented party partners, such as the Labour Union, the National Party of Retirees and Pensioners, the Self-Defence of the Republic of Poland and few members of Alliance of Democrats (Poland).

The coalition obtained 89 seats in provincial voivodeship sejmiks (12,04%) and 4,583 powiat and gmina councillor seats. However, the coalition was short-lived, dissolving by the next local elections in 2002.

References

1998 establishments in Poland
Agrarian parties in Poland
Defunct political party alliances in Poland
Polish People's Party
Political parties established in 1998